Crudia curtisii is a species of plant in the family Fabaceae. It is found in Malaysia.  The wood of trees of this genus in called "merbau kera", or "kempas rimau", or "jering tupai" in local language (depending on district/state).

References

External links
  Merbau Kera 

curtisii
Endemic flora of Peninsular Malaysia
Trees of Peninsular Malaysia